Valkenburg is a village and former municipality in the province of South Holland, in the western Netherlands.  Valkenburg is now part of the municipality Katwijk and had a population of 3,900 in 2006.

On 1 January 2006, Valkenburg and Rijnsburg were merged into the municipality of Katwijk.

On the second Wednesday in September there is a horse market, the oldest in the Netherlands. 2010 marked its 1066th year of operation.

The former Valkenburg Naval Air Base, which was situated here since 1936, was closed in 2006.

See also 

 Stoomtrein Valkenburgse Meer

References

External links 
 

Katwijk
Populated places in South Holland
Former municipalities of South Holland
Municipalities of the Netherlands disestablished in 2006